The 1962–63 Iraq FA Basra First Division (the top division of football in Basra) was organised by the Basra branch of the Iraq Football Association. Basra's teams were split into three divisions for the season. The First Division began on 9 October 1962, and Al-Minaa topped the table ahead of their B team to secure the league title.

League table

Results

References

External links
 Iraqi Football Website

Iraq FA Basra League seasons
Iraq
1962 in Iraqi sport
1963 in Iraqi sport